In mathematics, in the area of wavelet analysis, a refinable function is a function which fulfils some kind of self-similarity. A function  is called refinable with respect to the mask  if

This condition is called refinement equation, dilation equation or two-scale equation.

Using the convolution (denoted by a star, *) of a function with a discrete mask and the dilation operator  one can write more concisely:

It means that one obtains the function, again, if you convolve the function with a discrete mask and then scale it back.
There is a similarity to iterated function systems and de Rham curves.

The operator  is linear.
A refinable function is an eigenfunction of that operator.
Its absolute value is not uniquely defined.
That is, if  is a refinable function,
then for every  the function  is refinable, too.

These functions play a fundamental role in wavelet theory as scaling functions.

Properties

Values at integral points

A refinable function is defined only implicitly.
It may also be that there are several functions which are refinable with respect to the same mask.
If  shall have finite support
and the function values at integer arguments are wanted,
then the two scale equation becomes a system of simultaneous linear equations.

Let  be the minimum index and  be the maximum index

This is again a fixed-point equation. But this one can now be considered as an eigenvector-eigenvalue problem. That is, a finitely supported refinable function exists only (but not necessarily), if  has the eigenvalue 1.

Values at dyadic points

From the values at integral points you can derive the values at dyadic points,

The star denotes the convolution of a discrete filter with a function.
With this step you can compute the values at points of the form .
By replacing iteratedly  by  you get the values at all finer scales.

Convolution

Differentiation

This can be interpreted as a special case of the convolution property, where one of the convolution operands is a derivative of the Dirac impulse.

Integration

If  has bounded support,
then we can interpret integration as convolution with the Heaviside function and apply the convolution law.

Scalar products

Computing the scalar products of two refinable functions and their translates can be broken down to the two above properties.
Let  be the translation operator. It holds

and its values at integral arguments can be computed as eigenvectors of the transfer matrix.
This idea can be easily generalized to integrals of products of more than two refinable functions.

Smoothness

A refinable function usually has a fractal shape.
The design of continuous or smooth refinable functions is not obvious.
Before dealing with forcing smoothness it is necessary to measure smoothness of refinable functions.
Using the Villemoes machine
one can compute the smoothness of refinable functions in terms of Sobolev exponents.

In a first step the refinement mask  is divided into a filter , which is a power of the smoothness factor  (this is a binomial mask) and a rest .
Roughly spoken, the binomial mask  makes smoothness and
 represents a fractal component, which reduces smoothness again.
Now the Sobolev exponent is roughly

Generalization

The concept of refinable functions can be generalized to functions of more than one variable,
The most simple generalization is about tensor products.

The scheme can be generalized even more to different scaling factors with respect to different dimensions or even to mixing data between dimensions.
Instead of scaling by scalar factor like 2 the signal the coordinates are transformed by a matrix  of integers.
In order to let the scheme work, the absolute values of all eigenvalues of  must be larger than one.
(Maybe it also suffices that .)

Formally the two-scale equation does not change very much:

Examples

 If the definition is extended to distributions, then the Dirac impulse is refinable with respect to the unit vector , that is known as Kronecker delta.
 The triangular function is a refinable function. B-spline functions with successive integral nodes are refinable, because of the convolution theorem and the refinability of the characteristic function for the interval  (a boxcar function).
 All polynomial functions are refinable. For every refinement mask there is a polynomial that is uniquely defined up to a constant factor. For every polynomial of degree  there are many refinement masks that all differ by a mask of type  for any mask  and the convolutional power .
The Laurent polynomial  is the associated refinement mask.

References

See also
 Subdivision scheme

Wavelets